Melanie Robbins (née Schneeberger on October 6, 1968) is an American podcast host, author, motivational speaker, and former lawyer.  
She is known for her TEDx talk, "How to Stop Screwing Yourself Over"; and her books, The 5 Second Rule and The High 5 Habit, as well as host of The Mel Robbins Podcast.

Early life and education
Robbins was born in Kansas City, Missouri, and grew up in North Muskegon, Michigan. She attended Dartmouth College. She received a J.D. degree from Boston College Law School in 1994.

Career
Prior to joining CNN as a legal analyst, Robbins worked as a criminal defense attorney 
Robbins is known for covering the George Zimmerman trial for CNN; She hosted Cox Media Group's The Mel Robbins Show, A&E's Monster In-Laws, and Fox's Someone's Gotta Go.

In 2011, Robbins published Stop Saying You're Fine: Discover a More Powerful You. She spoke at TEDx San Francisco about a psychological trick that she termed "the five second rule". Her talk, viewed more than 31 million times on YouTube , launched her public speaking career.

On February 28, 2017, Robbins released her second book, The 5 Second Rule: Transform Your Life, Work, and Confidence with Everyday Courage. It was the top non-fiction book on Audible and sixth most-read book on Amazon in 2017.

She collaborated with Audible to release the Audible Original programs Kick Ass with Mel Robbins in June 2018 and Take Control of Your Life in 2019.

Her syndicated daytime talk show with Sony Pictures Television, The Mel Robbins Show, premiered on September 16, 2019. On January 29, 2020, Sony announced that the show would be canceled following its first season due to low ratings.

In 2014, Robbins received the Gracie Award for Outstanding Host–News/Non-fiction.

Personal life
In 1996, Robbins married entrepreneur Christopher Robbins. They have three children.

Selected works 

 Stop Saying You're Fine: Discover a More Powerful You. Harmony, 2011. Also published with the subtitle The No-BS Guide to Getting What You Want.
 The 5 Second Rule: Transform Your Life, Work, and Confidence with Everyday Courage. Savio Republic, 2017.
The High 5 Habit: Take Control of Your Life with One Simple Habit. Hay House, Inc. 2021.

References

External links
 
Mel Robbins on IMDb
Mel Robbins on CNN

Living people
1968 births
American television hosts
American talk radio hosts
CNN people
American motivational speakers
Life coaches
Dartmouth College alumni
Boston College Law School alumni
People from Sherborn, Massachusetts
People from Muskegon County, Michigan